The World Law Foundation is an international organization created by renowned jurists from around the world. Its main purpose is the defense of the rule of law. It is modeled on Winston Churchill's historic Iron Curtain speech (1946) that favored the law over the use of force.

Foundation 
The World Law Foundation (WLF) was created as a not-for-profit entity following the "Madrid Declaration" that closed the 2019 World Law Congress. It was registered  on January 14, 2020, and published in the Boletín Oficial del Estado (BOE) on September 14, 2020.

The foundation is governed by a board of trustees and a series of executive committees. It is supported by public and private donations, and supervised by the "Protectorado de Fundaciones" of the Spanish Ministry of Justice. 

The board of trustees is made up of its main promoters: the lawyer Javier Cremades, chairman; Alfredo Dagnino, lawyer of the Spanish Council of State,  secretary, and the following members: the commercial company "World Jurist Summit S.L.", journalist Juan Luis Cebrián,  Colombian lawyer Ulises Fernández Rojas, Lebanese lawyer Hachem Boulos, James M. Black II, jurist and professor, María Eugenia Gay, president of the Catalan Bar Council, and other respected lawyers such as Spanish Carlos de la Mata, Argentine lawyer Juan Pablo Gallego, Chilean lawyer Marcelo Montero Iglesias, and Venezuelan lawyer Juan Domingo Alfonzo Paradisi.

The foundation's objectives are the defense of the rule of law as a guarantee of progress; the promotion of dialogue between nations; respect for the law in international relations; and cooperation between the different legal and political actors in the different countries. 

Also through a series of activities: research and publications, advice to entities, governments and other non-governmental bodies, educational and training projects, events such as the "World Law Congress", the "Peace & Liberty Award" granted by the Foundation, or the Environmental Sustainability Congress (CSMA), co-organized by the Foundation.

World Law Congress 
The congress is held every two years and brings together conferences of different organizations. The main organizers are the foundation itself and the World Jurist Association, created in the United States in 1963. During the World Law Congress, now in its twenty-seventh year, more than two thousand leaders from around the world gather to discuss current issues that the legal world must address. Not only the most distinguished jurists, but also politicians, business people and other professionals whose careers converge with law-related issues. Human rights, financial litigation, constitutionalism, intellectual property, free journalism, democracy, among other topics, are discussed every two years during this event. 

The world congress held in Madrid under the slogan "Constitution, Democracy and Liberty" was held over three days, addressing several topics such as the relationship between democracy and the Constitution; parliamentary monarchies or the rule of law and the reaffirmation of peace through the mechanisms of law. During the Congress, the Peace & Liberty Award was presented to King Felipe VI for his response to the sovereignty challenge in Catalonia.

Peace & Liberty Award 
The World Law Foundation together with the World Association of Jurists award the "World Peace & Liberty Award" received by Winston Churchill, René Cassin, Nelson Mandela, King Felipe VI (2019), and by Ruth Bader Ginsburg (2020), U.S. Supreme Court Justice and founder of the Women's Rights Section of the American Civil Liberties Union.

References

External links 

 World Law Foundation Blog
 Official web site
Foundations
Law-related professional associations